Barry Michael Kerzin (born November 1, 1947) is an American physician and Buddhist monk.  He has lived in Dharamshala, India since 1988 and serves as a personal physician to the 14th Dalai Lama, along with treating people in the local community. Following his ordination as a monk by the Dalai Lama in January 2003, he has travelled, teaching and offering workshops in which he blends Buddhist teaching and his medical training.  He has served as a research participant in neuroscience research into the effects of meditation on the brain.

Kerzin is an adjunct professor (2021–22) at the University of Hong Kong (HKU), an adjunct professor (from 7/2020) at the University of Pittsburgh Medical Center, and a former Assistant Professor of Medicine at the University of Washington. He is founder and president of the Altruism in Medicine Institute (AIMI) and founder and chairman of the Human Values Institute (HVI) in Japan.

Early life and education 
Kerzin was born in Hollywood, California in the Good Samaritan Hospital on All Saints day, November 1, 1947.   He says, "It's all been downhill from there!" When he was fourteen, two books mysteriously came to him. One by D.T. Suzuki,  An Introduction to Zen Buddhism, and The Way of Zen, by Alan Watts.   Although he didn’t understand much, both books shifted something inside him. Starting at around six, he was plagued by questions of who he was and why he was here; they led him to join a philosophy club in high school and to switch to studying philosophy in college; he had started as a pre-med student.  He had wanted to become a doctor and did choose to continue on to medical school, because at the age of eleven he had a brain abscess that caused him to have seizures and fall into comas; it was eventually treated by a neurosurgeon with four brain surgeries over several years; the experience inspired him to become a doctor so that he could help other people.

Kerzin received BA in Philosophy from the University of California at Berkeley and in 1976 he received an MD degree from the University of Southern California.

Career
Kerzin did his residency at Ventura County Medical Center and practiced family medicine in Ojai, California for seven years.  His mother had died when he was 27, and just after he started working in Ojai, his wife was diagnosed with ovarian cancer. She died in 1983 and they had no children.

He travelled in India, Sri Lanka, and Nepal for nearly a year, visiting several monasteries.

He then obtained an appointment as an Assistant Professor of Medicine at the University of Washington School of Medicine from late 1985 to early 1989.

In the mid-1980s, B. Alan Wallace and the Dharma Friendship Foundation coaxed a lama from Dharamsala, Gen Lamrimpa, to come to Seattle for two years, and Kerzin served as his driver.  In 1988 Gen Lamrimpa returned to India and Kerzin accompanied him, intending to take a six-month leave of absence from the University of Washington.  He stayed in Dharamsala when his leave ended, and began providing free medical care to the local community, Dalai Lama and other Tibetan lamas.  He also began studying Buddhism and meditation intensively, and 19 years after he moved there (in the early-2000s), he was ordained in Feb. 2003 as a Bikkshu (Buddhist monk) by Dalai Lama, and now cares for him as his doctor.  Throughout his career, Kerzin has maintained his board certification with the American Board of Family Medicine.

In the mid-2000s, he served as a research subject in neuroscience research into the effects of meditation on the brain led by Richard J Davidson at the University of Wisconsin, as well as at Princeton University.

Kerzin founded the Human Values Institute in Japan in 2010 since teaching there regularly starting in 2007; he serves as chairman of the organization. The institute publishes books and instructional movies, gives lectures, leads workshops and meditation retreats, holds an annual symposium in Tokyo, and leads pilgrimages on the island of Shikoku; the education focuses on healthy physical and emotional living and handling death compassionately.  He taught about the Heart Sutra at the Gokokuji Temple in Tokyo shortly after the 2011 Tōhoku earthquake and tsunami. 

In 2014, Kerzin founded the Altruism in Medicine Institute (AIMI) in the US. One of the articles written on him is The Dalai Lama's Doctor has a Message for Pittsburgh, and during his November 2019 visit, Holiday Thoughts From The Dalai Lama's Physician. In 2019, Kerzin led the 2-day program Developing Altruistic Algorithms Based on Buddhist Philosophy for Artificial Intelligence, held at DeepMind (an Alphabet Group company) in London, UK. In 2020, he published the comment Beyond Empathy to Compassion in response to an article by George Gubernikoff, entitled Empathy Revisited (JAMA).

He participated in a 2011 weeklong workshop organized by scientists at the Max Planck Institute for Human Cognitive and Brain Sciences in Leipzig, exploring the role that compassion training has in changing human behavior and emotions.  The workshop led to a documentary film and a multimedia book to which Kerzin contributed two chapters.

He had a visiting professorship at the Central University of Tibetan Studies, Varanasi, India in 2006. At the University of Hong Kong he was appointed 'Visiting Professor of Medicine' for 2014 and 2015 and was made an Honorary Professor at the university's Centre of Buddhist Studies in March 2015.  Kerzin is a fellow of the Mind & Life Institute, which was initiated in 1985 to foster a dialogue between Buddhist scholars and Western scientists.

On the occasion of the Altruism in Medicine Institute's (AIMI) moving its headquarters to Pittsburgh, PA, Dr. Kerzin received a Proclamation from the Mayor of Pittsburgh, Mr. William Peduto, honouring Dr. Kerzin and AIMI's work as well as declaring Nov 19, 2021 as "Altruism in Medicine Institute Day" in Pittsburgh. AIMI, under the leadership of Dr. Kerzin, has been actively involved in building a strong community engagement focus with the Pittsburgh Police Department, initiated by Mayor William Peduto, since 2018. 

Altruism in Medicine Institute, under the auspices of Dr. Kerzin, is currently working on a compassion app for medical professionals.

Works 

 Publications: Kerzin is the author of No Fear No Death: The Transformative Power of Compassion; Nāgārjuna’s Wisdom: A Practitioner’s Guide to the Middle Way; The Tibetan Buddhist Prescription for Happiness (in Japanese); Mind and Matter: Dialogue between Two Nobel Laureates (in Japanese). Furthermore, Kerzin has written many chapters for books and done many interviews for radio and TV, in the US and abroad.
 TEDx Talks: He delivered a TEDx talk, on Happiness in 2010, in 2014 on Compassion and Anger Management, and in 2022 at TEDx Pittsburgh 'Time Capsule' on compassion and resilience.  
 Documentaries: Kerzin was featured in the 2006 U.S. Public Broadcasting Service documentary entitled The New Medicine. This TV documentary received a largely negative review in the Wall Street Journal, but a more positive one appeared in the New York Times.
Featured in the March 2020 PBS Podcast under-told Stories "The Dalai Lama's Doctor"
Mind & Life Talk: 'Mind Matters - No Center, No Edge: Letting Go of a Fixed Identity' in June 2022
2022 - The Wellbeing Summit for Social Change (Bilbao): Inner Work & Wellbeing | Coming Home to Ourselves in June 2022
2022 - Compassion Lecture Series (Pittsburgh - USA), in cooperation with The Forbes Funds
2022 - Interview by the Well Being Project

External links 

 Altruism in Medicine
Human Values Institute

References 

1947 births
Living people
American Buddhist monks
Tibetan Buddhists from the United States
American Buddhist spiritual teachers
American consciousness researchers and theorists
Keck School of Medicine of USC alumni
University of California, Berkeley alumni
American primary care physicians